Seth Millington Jr. served in the California State Assembly for the 4th district and during World War I he served in the United States Army.

References

United States Army personnel of World War I
1893 births
1973 deaths
Democratic Party members of the California State Assembly
20th-century American politicians